Wescom Credit Union is a credit union and financial services company serving Southern California. It has nearly $6 billion in assets and more than 200,000 members. It currently has 24 branches, both stand-alone offices and branches inside of grocery stores, as well as a CUSO called Wescom Resources Group headquartered in Pasadena, California that provides technology products and services to credit unions across the United States.

History
The credit union was founded as Telephone Employees Credit Union in 1934 by 13 individuals who wanted to create an alternative to banks. In 1996, the Credit Union changed its name to Wescom Credit Union, typically shortened to Wescom. It primarily served the telecommunications industry until 1999, when its field of membership was expanded to allow anyone living, working, worshiping, or going to school in Los Angeles, Orange, Riverside, San Bernardino, and Ventura counties to join Wescom. Santa Barbara County was added to Wescom's field of membership in 2004, and San Diego County was added in 2005. , Wescom had an "A+" rating from the Better Business Bureau.

Services
Wescom Credit Union offers these services:

 Checking, savings, money market, certificates, and youth accounts
 Mortgages
 Home Equity Line of Credit
 Auto loans
 Credit Cards
 Student Loans
 Financial education and counseling
 Auto, homeowners, renters, life, health, and dental insurance
 Investment services

References

External links
 Wescom Credit Union

Credit unions based in California
Banks established in 1934
1934 establishments in California